"The Way It Is" is a song by American rock group Bruce Hornsby and the Range. It was released in the United States in September 1986 as the second single from their debut album, The Way It Is. The song topped the charts in the US, Canada and the Netherlands in 1986, and peaked inside the top twenty in such countries as Australia, Ireland, Switzerland and the United Kingdom.

Written by Bruce Hornsby, it made explicit reference to the Economic Opportunity Act, also known as the 1964 Poverty Act, as well as the Civil Rights Act of 1964.  Musically, the song is characterized by two long piano solos. The song has been sampled by various rappers such as E-40 for his song "Things'll Never Change", by Tupac for "Changes", by DJ Don Diablo for his song "Never Change", and Polo G for "Wishing for a Hero" in 2020.

Content
The opening verse recounts a story taking place at a line for welfare that illustrates a divide between the rich and poor; the second verse recounts ongoing social issues from the voice of someone supporting racial segregation. The final verse recounts the passage of the Economic Opportunity Act in 1964 "to give those who ain't got a little more", and the Civil Rights Act of 1964 as a victory in the civil rights movement against job discrimination, but insists that more is needed.

Hornsby's brother John said, "The song is mainly about compassion, about understanding racial and social types, and beliefs and practices that are different from your own. It's about a status quo that's so complacent in its narrow-mindedness and bigotry that it seems it'll never change. That's why the line 'Ah, but don’t you believe them' is so important." The way it is evokes people to give to the poor and to protest against racial segregation, white supremacy and economic value.

Charts

Weekly charts

Year end charts

In popular culture
An adapted version of "The Way It Is" was used as the theme tune for BBC One's City Hospital, a medical documentary television series which ran from 1998 to 2007.
In the Community episode "Advanced Criminal Law", Pierce Hawthorne (played by Chevy Chase) writes a school song entitled "The Way It Goes", an unwitting rip-off of "The Way It Is".
 The song was used for many years on Grandstand in the league tables segment.

See also
 Civil rights movement in popular culture

References

1980s ballads
1986 singles
1986 songs
1993 singles
Bruce Hornsby songs
Billboard Hot 100 number-one singles
Cashbox number-one singles
Dutch Top 40 number-one singles
RCA Records singles
Rock ballads
RPM Top Singles number-one singles
Songs about poverty
Songs against racism and xenophobia
Songs based on American history